A noa-name is a word that replaces a taboo word, generally out of fear that the true name would summon the thing. The term derives from the Polynesian concept of noa, which is the antonym of tapu (from which derives the word taboo) and serves to lift the tapu from a person or object. 

A noa-name is sometimes described as a euphemism, though the meaning is more specific; a noa-name is a non-taboo synonym used to avoid bad luck, and replaces a name considered dangerous. The noa-name may be innocuous or flattering, or it may be more accusatory.

Examples
Examples of noa-names are:
In English, the Devil has been referred to by a variety of names (e.g. 'Old Nick', 'Mr. Scratch') to avoid attracting his attention through his name.
In Irish folklore, Fairies are referred to as 'the little people', or 'the good people'.
In Greek legend, the Erinyes (the Furies, the spirits of revenge) were commonly known as the Eumenides ('the benevolent ones').
In Jewish culture, it is forbidden to speak the name of God (represented as YHWH) and the noa-name adonai, 'my lord', or HaShem, 'the Name', is used instead.
(See Finnish mythology.)
To avoid the negative connotations of the left side and left-handedness, most Romance languages created noa-names to avoid Latin : see French , Spanish , Romanian .

See also
Mokita, a Trobriand term that translates as 'the truth we all know but agree not to talk about'
Avoidance speech, a sociolinguistic phenomenon found in some aboriginal languages
The evil wizard Lord Voldemort, typically referred to in the Harry Potter series as "He Who Must Not Be Named" or "You-Know-Who"
The name of the William Shakespeare play Macbeth is, by longstanding theatrical custom, not to be mentioned in order to avoid bad luck; reference is instead made, for instance, to "the Scottish play"
Apotropaic names are negative words applied to ward off evil.

References

English-language idioms
Etiquette
Euphemisms
Taboo